Quần Ngựa Sports Palace ( or simply Cung thể thao Quần Ngựa) is a palace of sports situated in Ba Đình District, Hanoi, Vietnam.

History
The venue was built on the site that used to be an equestrianism center of Hanoi during the French occupation period in late 19th and early 20th century. Its current name "Quần Ngựa" (horse riding court) derived from the site's equestrian origin. It opened in 2003 in time for the 22nd Southeast Asian Games.

Design
The sports palace consists of 10 departmental rooms, 2 meeting rooms, and 2 halls while the complex also includes practice halls, housing for athletes, transformation station and security department.

Quần Ngựa Sports Palace has a  competition field surrounded by 4 spectators' stands with a total capacity of 5,500 seats.

Usage

2003 Southeast Asian Games (gymnastics)
2003 ASEAN Para Games (badminton, closing ceremony)
2009 Asian Indoor Games (dancesport)
2021 Southeast Asian Games (gymnastics)

References

Indoor arenas in Vietnam
2003 establishments in Vietnam
Sport in Hanoi
Sports venues completed in 2003
Buildings and structures in Hanoi
Southeast Asian Games stadiums
Gymnastics venues
2003 Southeast Asian Games